Calothamnus aridus is a plant in the myrtle family, Myrtaceae and is endemic to central parts of Western Australia. It is an erect, densely branched shrub with many stems, needle-like leaves and orange-red to pinkish flowers, growing in arid areas with spinifex.

Description

The flowers are arranged in clusters or loose spikes of up to 10 on the younger stems. The stamens are arranged in five claw-like bundles, each  with 10 to 12 stamens per bundle. The stamens are a shade of orange to red in the lower part and pinkish red near the ends and tipped with yellow anthers.

Taxonomy and naming
The specific epithet (aridus) is derived from Latin, referring to the arid habitat in which this species grow.

In 2014 Craven, Edwards and Cowley proposed that the species be renamed Melaleuca arida but the change is not accepted by the Australian Plant Census.

Distribution and habitat
Calothamnus aridus occurs in and between the Paynes Find, Sandstone and Wiluna districts in the Avon Wheatbelt, Little Sandy Desert and Murchison  biogeographic regions. It grows in woodland and sandplain in association with Triodia species.

Conservation status
Calothamnus aridus is classified as "not threatened" by the Western Australian Government Department of Parks and Wildlife.

References

aridus
Myrtales of Australia
Plants described in 1984
Endemic flora of Western Australia